Yeşiltaş can refer to:

 Yeşiltaş, Çınar
 Yeşiltaş, Yüksekova